Kamrupi Dhuliya are traditional folk drummers from Kamrup who play large and wide big drums called Bor Dhul mostly in ethnic festivals, traditional wedding or especially folk religious traditions of aboriginal Saivitie or Sakti cults mostly.

Though associated with playing the Bor Dhul, they are also known for mixing acting and acrobatic skills with same during some acts. Spontaneity of expressions and quickness of mind and feet were the hallmarks of Kamrupi Dhuliya's. Drumming is accompanied by songs and acting skills sometimes.

The Bor Dhul make a deep low-pitched tribal drumming sounds and mostly are played by marginalised indigenous ethnicities especially the Kaibarta along with Rabha, Koch, Sarania and some Boros etc.

See also
 Kamrupi Lokgeet

References

Further reading
 

Indian drummers
Music of Assam
Kamrupi musicians
Kamrupi culture